Lieutenant-General Sir Desmond Francis Anderson  (5 July 1885 – 29 January 1967) was a senior British Army officer in both the First and the Second World Wars.

Early life and First World War
Anderson was born in Dunham Massey and attended Rugby College before entering the Royal Military College, Sandhurst, where he was commissioned as a second lieutenant into the Devonshire Regiment in 1905. He transferred to the East Yorkshire Regiment in 1910. He served as the adjutant of the 1st Battalion, East Yorkshire Regiment from 1912.

Then he went with the battalion to the Western Front in 1914, where he served until July 1917 in a number of combat and staff roles, during which time he was wounded and received the Distinguished Service Order in 1915. A captain in 1916, he fought in the Battle of the Somme as a company commander of Company 'C', he was mentioned in despatches four times and in 1920 received the French Legion of Honour for his wartime service.

Between the wars
After attending staff college, he was appointed Commanding Officer of 1st Bn East Yorkshire Regiment in 1927, Assistant Quartermaster General at Aldershot Command in 1932 and General Staff Officer Grade 1 at 5th Division in 1933. He went on to be Deputy Director of Military Operations & Intelligence at the War Office in 1934, Deputy Director of Military Intelligence at the War Office in 1936 and Major-General in charge of Administration for Eastern Command in 1938.

Second World War

At the start of the war Anderson was major-general on the General Staff for the Home Forces. He became General Officer Commanding 45th Infantry Division in early 1940 and then spent a few months as Assistant Chief of the Imperial General Staff at the War Office before becoming General Officer Commanding 46th Division in June 1940.

He was promoted to command III Corps in December 1940. During 1942 he went to Baghdad where III Corps were part of Persia and Iraq Command's Tenth Army. In 1943 he transferred to command II Corps and he retired from the army in 1944.

See also
 Iraqforce
 Desmond Anderson Primary School

References

Bibliography

External links
British Army Officers 1939−1945
Generals of World War II
 

|-
 

|-

|-

|-

|-

1885 births
1967 deaths
Devonshire Regiment officers
East Yorkshire Regiment officers
British Army personnel of World War I
British Army generals of World War II
Knights Commander of the Order of the British Empire
Companions of the Order of the Bath
Companions of the Order of St Michael and St George
Companions of the Distinguished Service Order
Recipients of the Legion of Honour
Recipients of the Order of Saint Stanislaus (Russian)
Graduates of the Royal Military College, Sandhurst
Graduates of the Staff College, Camberley
British Army lieutenant generals
People educated at Rugby School
Military personnel from Manchester